Eilema uniola is a moth of the subfamily Arctiinae first described by Jules Pierre Rambur in 1866. It is found in Spain, Portugal, France and Italy.

The larvae feed on lichen.

References
"10500 Eilema uniola (Rambur, 1858)". Lepiforum e.V.

uniola
Moths of Europe
Taxa named by Jules Pierre Rambur
Moths described in 1866